Pennsylvania Route 437 (PA 437) is an  state highway located in Luzerne County in Pennsylvania.  The southern terminus is at PA 940 in White Haven.  The northern terminus is at PA 309 in the Fairview Township community of Mountain Top. PA 437 runs southeast-northwest through forested mountain areas as a two-lane undivided road. The roadway was paved by 1930 and designated PA 437 in the 1960s.

Route description

PA 437 begins at an intersection with PA 940 in the borough of White Haven, heading north on two-lane undivided Church Street. The route passes homes and some businesses before crossing into Dennison Township and becoming an unnamed road. At this point, the road runs through a mix of farmland and woodland. Farther northwest, PA 437 heads through forested mountain areas and passes under the Reading Blue Mountain and Northern Railroad's Lehigh Division line before entering Wright Township. Here, the road becomes Woodlawn Avenue and crosses through a tract of the Pinchot State Forest, making a turn to the north and running a short distance to the east of the railroad line. In this area, the road heads past a few residences as it continues into Fairview Township and winds north past more forests with occasional homes. PA 437 makes a turn to the northwest as it passes over the railroad tracks and comes to its northern terminus at PA 309 in the community of Mountain Top.

History
When Pennsylvania first legislated routes in 1911, the present-day alignment of PA 437 was not given a route number. The highway between White Haven and Mountain Top was a paved road by 1930. PA 437 was designated in the 1960s to follow its current alignment between PA 940 in White Haven and PA 309 in Mountain Top.

Major intersections

PA 437 Truck

Pennsylvania Route 437 Truck is a truck route of PA 437 that bypasses a weight-restricted bridge over a tributary of Creasy Creek in Dennison Township, on which trucks over 28 tons and combination loads over 34 tons are prohibited. The route follows PA 940, I-80, and PA 309. It was signed in 2013. The bridge was completely reconstructed in 2017, and PennDOT removed all PA 437 Truck signs from the roads it followed.

See also

References

External links

Pennsylvania Highways: PA 437

437
Transportation in Luzerne County, Pennsylvania